Delia Scala (born Odette Bedogni; 25 September 1929 – 15 January 2004) was an Italian ballerina, actress and singer who played a leading role in the nascent commedia musicale.

Career 
Scala was born as Odette Bedogni in Bracciano, Lazio, Italy. When she was a young girl, her family moved to Milan where she studied ballet at "La Scala" Ballet School for seven years. She performed in numerous ballets until World War II, after which she began appearing in motion pictures using the stage name, Delia Scala. These include Difficult Years (Anni difficili, 1948), Side Street Story (Napoli milionaria, 1950), Rome 11:00 (Roma ore 11, 1952), Touchez pas au grisbi (1954), Gentlemen Are Born (Signori si nasce, 1960).

In 1954 Delia made her theatre debut with Giove in doppiopetto (Double-breasted Jupiter). The show is considered the first "Commedia musicale", an italian musical genre created by playwrights Pietro Garinei and Sandro Giovannini with the collaboration of the musician and songwriter Gorni Kramer. Scala later starred in Buonanotte Bettina (Goodnight Bettina, 1956) with Walter Chiari, L'adorabile Giulio (The Adorable Giulio, 1957) with Carlo Dapporto, Un trapezio per Lisistrata (A Trapeze for Lisistrata, 1958) with Nino Manfredi and Paolo Panelli, Delia Scala Show (1960), Rinaldo in campo (Rinaldo into the Field, 1961) with Domenico Modugno, My Fair Lady (1964) with Gianrico Tedeschi and Mario Carotenuto, and Il giorno della tartaruga (The Day of the Turtle, 1965) with Renato Rascel.

In 1956 Scala appeared in the TV show Lui e Lei (Him and Her, 1956) with Nino Taranto. In 1959–60 she co-hosted Canzonissima with Nino Manfredi and Paolo Panelli.

After twelve consecutive years of performances in Italy and Europe, Scala began to experience fatigue. In 1965, at the height of her success (she had received offers from Broadway), she suddenly decided to drop out from live performances. In 1966 she married and temporarily retired to spend time with her family.

In 1968 Scala made a comeback with Delia Scala Story, a show written by Garinei and Giovannini. This was followed in 1970 by the very successful Signore e signora (Mr. and Madame) with Lando Buzzanca. After a nine-year break, she starred in the show Che combinazione (What a Coincidence) alongside Don Lurio.

From 1980 to 1983, Scala conceived and hosted the show Una rosa per la Vita (A Rose for Life) to raise funds to support cancer prevention and research at the Bussoladomani arena in Lido di Camaiore, together with Raimondo Vianello and Sandra Mondaini, .

In 1982 Scala returned to television with the RAI fiction Casa Cecilia (Cecilia's Home), where she performed for three seasons. Her final TV role was in the sitcom Io e la mamma, (Mum and I) aired between 1996 and 1998 on Canale 5.

Personal life
Scala achieved great professional success, but her personal life was marred by misfortune and tragedy. In 1946, at the age 17, she married a Greek military officer who had come to Italy to join the partisan forces in the fight against the Nazi-fascists. They separated two years later, and she got the marriage voided in 1956.

During the mid-1950s Scala was engaged with Formula One race car driver Eugenio Castellotti. He died in 1957 when his Ferrari crashed while attempting a speed record at the Modena race track.

In 1967 she married Piero Giannotti.The marriage lasted until 1982 when Giannotti died of a heart attack while cycling along the beach in Viareggio. She married a third time in 1985 with industrialist Arturo Fremura. The marriage ended with her husband's death of liver cancer in 2001.

In 1974 Delia Scala was diagnosed with breast cancer, and underwent a radical mastectomy. Although she appeared to have made a full recovery, in 2002 she was struck again with the same illness. Scala died in 2004 in Livorno, Tuscany. She rests in the Cimitero della Misericordia in Livorno.

At the time of her death, Italian President Carlo Azeglio Ciampi called her a "model of enthusiasm and rigorous professionalism" and said he rated her among "the most beloved and popular artists in the history of Italian entertainment".

Credits

Stage

Film

Television

Radio

References

External links

1929 births
2004 deaths
People from Bracciano
Italian ballerinas
Italian film actresses
Italian television actresses
Deaths from breast cancer
Deaths from cancer in Tuscany
Italian television presenters
Italian women television presenters